William Donovan Joynt, VC (19 March 1889 – 6 June 1986) was a printer, publisher, author and an Australian recipient of the Victoria Cross, the highest military  award for gallantry in the face of the enemy given to British and Commonwealth forces.

Early life
Joynt was born at Elsternwick, Melbourne and educated at The Grange Preparatory School and later Melbourne Church of England Grammar School. After working in a number of office jobs in Melbourne, in 1909 he sailed to Rockhampton and worked as a farm labourer in North Queensland, the Victorian Mallee, Western Australia and Flinders Island.

First World War

Joynt enlisted in the Australian Imperial Force (AIF) on 21 May 1915, was commissioned on 24 December 1915, and arrived in France in May 1916. He fought in France until August 1918, where he was commended in divisional orders, shot in the shoulder, and promoted to lieutenant.

On 23 August 1918, Joynt was 29 years old, and a lieutenant in the 8th Battalion (Victoria), Australian Imperial Force during the First World War, when the following events occurred.

He was badly wounded by a shell on 26 August and evacuated to England. He was promoted to captain in October 1918, and posted to AIF Headquarters in London in March 1919. He returned to Melbourne in February 1920, and was discharged on 11 June.

Inter-bellum
Having studied agriculture and sheep-breeding in England in 1919, in 1920 Joynt became a soldier settler, dairy farming near Berwick. By 1929 he was pursuing business interests in Melbourne, where he was a pioneer of colour printing in Australia. About 1920 he had formed Queen City Printers Pty Ltd, and subsequently formed Colarts Studios Pty Ltd and bought the rights to a German colour-printing process. In the early 1920s he toured an exhibition titled 'The Pictorial Panorama of the Great War Under various business names, Joynt remained a printer and publisher for over sixty years.

He married Edith Amy Garrett, a trained nurse, in a civil ceremony at Hawthorn on 19 March 1932, his forty-third birthday.

Joynt was one of a number of ex-servicemen who in 1923 founded the Legacy Club of Melbourne, the first of fifty Legacy Clubs. He helped lead the club’s successful campaign to have Melbourne’s Shrine of Remembrance built in its present form on its present site. He was active in the Militia in 1926–33, being promoted to major in February 1930.

Second World War
Joynt was mobilised on 26 September 1939 and placed in command of the at Fort Queenscliff and subsequently Puckapunyal. From June 1942 he was camp staff officer then quartermaster at Seymour camp.

Having passed his 55th birthday, he was placed on the Retired List as an honorary lieutenant colonel on 10 October 1944.

Post war
Joynt and his wife rented, then bought, Tom Roberts’ old home, Talisman, at Kallista and lived there until they built their own home nearby.

He wrote three books:
   – travel through the Soviet Union
   – a regimental history of the 8th Battalion
   – autobiography

His wife Edith died in 1978. The last surviving of Australia’s World War I VC recipients, he died on 5 May 1986 at Windsor and was buried with full military honours in Brighton Cemetery. He had no children.

References

External links
Bill Gammage, 'Joynt, William Donovan (1889–1986)', Australian Dictionary of Biography, Volume 17, Melbourne University Press, pp 599–600.
Lt Joint, 8th Battalion VCs, www.defence.gov.au

1889 births
1986 deaths
Australian colonels
Australian autobiographers
Australian farmers
Australian Army personnel of World War II
Australian printers
Australian World War I recipients of the Victoria Cross
People educated at Melbourne Grammar School
Military personnel from Melbourne
People from Elsternwick, Victoria
Writers from Melbourne